Prince's Lakes is a town in Nineveh Township, Johnson County, Indiana, United States. The population was 1,312 at the 2010 census.

History
Prince's Lakes was incorporated as a town in 1956. It took its name from four lakes in the area, each of which contains Prince's in its name.

Geography

Demographics

2010 census
As of the census of 2010, there were 1,312 people, 528 households, and 369 families living in the town. The racial makeup of the town was 98.8% White, 0.2% African American, 0.4% Native American, 0.3% Asian, 0.1% from other races, and 0.3% from two or more races. Hispanic or Latino of any race were 0.9% of the population.

There were 528 households, of which 31.3% had children under the age of 18 living with them, 57.0% were married couples living together, 8.3% had a female householder with no husband present, 4.5% had a male householder with no wife present, and 30.1% were non-families. 23.9% of all households were made up of individuals, and 6.5% had someone living alone who was 65 years of age or older. The average household size was 2.48 and the average family size was 2.94.

The median age in the town was 42.5 years. 23% of residents were under the age of 18; 6.7% were between the ages of 18 and 24; 24.8% were from 25 to 44; 34.5% were from 45 to 64; and 11% were 65 years of age or older. The gender makeup of the town was 48.5% male and 51.5% female.

2000 census
As of the census of 2000, there were 1,506 people, 597 households, and 434 families living in the town. The racial makeup of the town was 98.94% White, 0.27% African American, 0.07% Native American, 0.27% Asian, 0.07% from other races, and 0.40% from two or more races. Hispanic or Latino of any race were 1.06% of the population.

There were 597 households, out of which 32.7% had children under the age of 18 living with them, 63.5% were married couples living together, 5.7% had a female householder with no husband present, and 27.3% were non-families. 21.1% of all households were made up of individuals, and 8.5% had someone living alone who was 65 years of age or older. The average household size was 2.52 and the average family size was 2.94.

In the town, the population was spread out, with 25.0% under the age of 18, 5.2% from 18 to 24, 32.1% from 25 to 44, 26.9% from 45 to 64, and 10.8% who were 65 years of age or older. The median age was 39 years. For every 100 females, there were 97.6 males. For every 100 females age 18 and over, there were 96.0 males.

The median income for a household in the town was $46,339, and the median income for a family was $49,236. Males had a median income of $36,417 versus $25,000 for females. The per capita income for the town was $19,378. About 2.4% of families and 6.2% of the population were below the poverty line, including 6.0% of those under age 18 and 8.6% of those age 65 or over.

Education
Residents are served by the Nineveh-Hensley-Jackson United School Corporation, including Indian Creek Senior High School.

References

Towns in Johnson County, Indiana
Towns in Indiana
Indianapolis metropolitan area